Newfrontiers (previously New Frontiers International) is a neo-charismatic church network of evangelical, charismatic churches founded by Terry Virgo. It forms part of the British New Church Movement, which began in the late 1950s and 1960s combining features of Pentecostalism with British evangelicalism.  Other streams of the British New Church Movement with which it shares some features include Together, Ministries Without Borders,  and Life-Links. Groups like Pioneer, Ichthus Christian Fellowship, and Vineyard are more distantly related. Newfrontiers describes itself as "a group of apostolic leaders partnering together on global mission, joined by common values and beliefs, shared mission and genuine relationships". Its theology is distinctively Reformed. Newfrontiers is committed to building churches according to "New Testament principles". One of the slogans of the movement has been "changing the expression of Christianity around the world", which is based on a prophecy given to the movement in 1990 by Paul Cain, a Latter Rain revivalist.

History

In the early days of the movement a Bible week called "The Downs" was held at Plumpton Racecourse each year. This was replaced by "Stoneleigh Bible Week", which was held at the National Agricultural Centre showground. After the Stoneleigh Bible Week was stopped, a number of smaller more regional events were started, such as "North Camp" which was held in the North of England near Teesside. After running for 10 years "North Camp" was to cease after the 2013 event. Then after two years it started again under a new name, 'Devoted'. Newday is a camping event attended by young people between the ages of 12 and 19.

In 2011, Terry Virgo handed over leadership to a score of leaders worldwide, each of whom is described as being "free to develop his own strategies, training programs, and gospel advance".

Church practice
Every Newfrontiers church has its own unique approach to participatory worship, but most commonly, anyone wishing to contribute during corporate worship must first share it with the leader of the meeting. If it is considered to be potentially beneficial to the whole church body, any worship music being played will subside for a moment, and the individual can address the congregation. In other Newfrontiers churches the expectation is that members of the congregation will speak out if they feel they have received an idea, message, (mental) image or verse of Scripture, and no prior approval is required or expected.

In each local church leadership is expressed in a plurality of local (male) elders (though generally one of the elders takes a leading or senior role), often with multiple staff.

Theology

Complementarianism
All Newfrontiers churches hold to a complementarian position on gender similar to that promoted by the Council on Biblical Manhood and Womanhood. This means that women are not elders or apostolic ministers. However, women are leaders – and in many churches actively preach, teach and are a part of decision making affecting local, regional and national church decisions. Women also hold positions in almost every other area in the church and are encouraged to do so.

Homosexuality
Newfrontiers do not believe that being gay is a sin, but that sexual acts of homosexuality are not okay. It strongly condemns homophobia. However, views differ from church to church. There have been claims that at least one Newfrontiers church has attempted to "cure" gay people, though these have been strongly disputed.

Spiritual strongholds
A book by prominent Newfrontiers leader David Devenish on "spiritual warfare", praised by Terry Virgo as a text that "will help to fortify every believer intent on winning this battle", defines spiritual warfare as

Responses
Nigel Wright believes that Newfrontiers and other British restorationists are claiming too much when they speak of "restoring the church".

In 1986, sociologist and church historian Andrew Walker wrote of Newfrontiers that "churches are far more centralised and controlled than those of… mainline charismatic fellowships…  The situation seems slightly analogous to Japanese business practices: they… export with great success, but import virtually nothing from anybody else".

In April 2009, the Journal of Beliefs and Values published an article reporting on a 2007 study which "set out to examine the psychological type profile of Lead Elders within the Newfrontiers network of churches in the United Kingdom and to compare this profile with the established profile of clergymen in the Church of England". One of the conclusions:

In February 2016, musician Joseph Coward wrote an article for Vice Magazine, in which he described a now disbanded Newfrontiers church. He claimed that it had "all the hallmarks of a cult".

References

Further reading
 .
 .
 .
 .
 .

External links
 
 

 
Apostolic networks
Evangelicalism in the United Kingdom
British New Church Movement
Christian organizations established in 1979